Chura Sharif is a village situated in Jand Tehsil of Attock District in Punjab Province of Pakistan.
Chura Sharif has the largest Naqshbandi shrine in the Indian Sub-continent. It is the centre of the Naqshbandi order in the sub-continent.

Education 
The village has two government school, a high school each for boys and girls.

Government Boys High School Chura Sharif

References

Villages in Attock District